Three Women is an upcoming television series based on the 2019 book of the same name by Lisa Taddeo initially set to premiere on Showtime. On January 30, 2023, Deadline reported that Showtime had decided not to air the completed series. Starz picked up the series a week later.

Premise
A group of women are on a course to radically change their lives.

Cast and characters

Main
 Shailene Woodley as Gia
 DeWanda Wise as Sloane
 Betty Gilpin as Lina
 Gabrielle Creevy as Maggie
 Blair Underwood as Richard
 John Patrick Amedori as Jack

Recurring
 Ravi Patel as Dr. Henry
 Austin Stowell as Aidan
 Lola Kirke as Jenny
 Jason Ralph as Aaron Knodel
 Blair Redford as Will
 Jess Gabor as Billie
 Brían F. O'Byrne as Mark Wilkin
 Heather Goldenhersh as Arlene Wilkin
 Zane Pais as David Wilkin
 Tony D. Head  as Stephen

Production

Development
In July 2019, Showtime acquired rights to Three Women by Lisa Taddeo, with Taddeo attached to write and executive produce. On January 30, 2023, Deadline reported that Showtime had decided not to air the completed series, amid a reorganization at parent company Paramount Global and a review of Showtime's programming slate, but was being shopped to other services. The series was later picked up by Starz in early February.

Casting
In July 2021, Shailene Woodley and DeWanda Wise joined the cast of the series. In September 2021, Betty Gilpin joined the cast in a series regular capacity, with Ravi Patel joining in recurring capacity. In October 2021, Blair Underwood and Gabrielle Creevy joined the cast in series regular capacity, with Austin Stowell and Lola Kirke joining in recurring capacity. In November 2021, Jason Ralph, Blair Redford and Jess Gabor joined in recurring roles. In December 2021, John Patrick Amedori joined the cast in a series regular capacity. In February 2022, Brían F. O'Byrne and Heather Goldenhersh joined the cast in recurring capacity.

Filming
Principal photography began by October 2021, taking place in Long Island, New York. In November 2021, scenes were shot in Schenectady, New York.

References

External links
 

English-language television shows
Television shows based on non-fiction books
Works about sex
Upcoming television series
Starz original programming